The 1925 College Basketball All-Southern Team consisted of basketball players from the South chosen at their respective positions.

All-Southerns

Guards
Billy Devin, North Carolina (MB)
Carl Lind, Tulane (MB)

Forwards
Jack Cobb, North Carolina (MB)
C. Ellis Henican, Tulane (MB)

Center
Bill Dodderer, North Carolina (MB)

Key
MB = selected by Morgan Blake in the Atlanta Journal.

References

All-Southern